Apsarasa praslini is a moth of the family Noctuidae first described by Jean Baptiste Boisduval in 1832. It is found in south-eastern Asia, from the Moluccas eastward.

References

Acronictinae